Patrick Alexandroni (1962–2008) was a French actor, rapper, and television producer.

References

1962 births
2008 deaths
French male stage actors
20th-century French male singers
People from Roanne